Season 2011/12 in the French Elite One Championship, the top level rugby league competition in France saw 10 teams play home and away matches before the top six progressed to the play-offs. The season ran from September to May. There were two new clubs, Toulouse Olympique returned to the competition after they had participated in the British rugby league second tier Championship and RC Lescure-Arthes XIII who had won promotion from the French second tier Elite Two Championship. Pia XIII finished top after the regular season and went on to reach the grand final, but they were beaten by AS Carcassonne in that final at Narbonne 26-20. The same two teams had already met in the Lord Derby Cup final with AS Carcassonne enjoying a league and cup double after winning 14-12. At the other end of the table Montpellier Red Devils opted for relegation thus saving new boys RC Lescure-Arthes XIII who had finished bottom.

Table 

Points win=3: draw=2: loss=1:

*(deducted 4 pts)

Play-offs 
Week 1
 Quarter-Final - Lézignan Sangliers 28-4 Toulouse Olympique
 Quarter-Final - SO Avignon 36-12 Saint-Esteve XIII Catalan
Week 2
 Semi-Final   - Pia XIII 28-20 Lézignan Sangliers
 Semi-Final   - AS Carcassonne 31-30 SO Avignon

Grand Final

See also 

Rugby league in France
French Rugby League Championship
Elite One Championship

References

External links 

 French rugby league website

Rugby league competitions in France
2011 in French rugby league
2012 in French rugby league